Lamotte-Brebière is a former railway station serving the French town of Lamotte-Brebière in the Somme department. It is situated on the Paris–Lille railway. The station was served by local TER Picardie services between Lille and Amiens. It was closed for passenger trains in 2011.

Defunct railway stations in Somme (department)